ABC 12 may refer to one of the following television stations in the United States:

Current affiliates
KBMT in Beaumont/Port Arthur, Texas
KDRV in Medford, Oregon
KODE-TV in Joplin, Missouri 	
KSAT-TV in San Antonio, Texas
KSGW-TV in Sheridan, Wyoming
Re-broadcast of KOTA-TV in Rapid City, South Dakota
KTXS-TV in Sweetwater/Abilene, Texas
KVIH-TV in Clovis, New Mexico
Re-broadcast of KVII-TV, in Amarillo, Texas
WBOY-DT2 in Clarksburg/Weston, West Virginia
WCTI-TV in New Bern/Greenville/Washington, North Carolina
WISN-TV in Milwaukee, Wisconsin
WJRT-TV in Flint/Saginaw/Bay City, MI

Formerly affiliated
KGNS-DT2 in Laredo, TX (briefly branded as NGNS 12 in 2014)
KLOR-TV in Portland, Oregon (1955 to 1956)
KPTV in Portland, Oregon (1959 to 1964)
KVLF-TV in Alpine, Texas (1961 to 1963)
Was a semi-satellite of KVKM-TV in Monahans, Texas (now KWES-TV in Odessa) 
WEAT-TV/WPEC in West Palm Beach, Florida (1955 to 1989)
WKRC-TV in Cincinnati, Ohio (1961 to 1996)
WPRO-TV/WPRI-TV in Providence, Rhode Island (1977 to 1995)
WRVA-TV (now WWBT) in Richmond, Virginia (1960 to 1965)
WTLV in Jacksonville, Florida (1980 to 1988)